Anna Christie is a play in four acts by Eugene O'Neill. It made its Broadway debut at the Vanderbilt Theatre on November 2, 1921. O'Neill received the 1922 Pulitzer Prize for Drama for this work. According to historian Paul Avrich, the original of Anna Christie was Christine Ell, an anarchist cook in Greenwich Village, who was the lover of Edward Mylius, a Belgian-born radical living in England who libeled the British king George V.

Plot summary
Anna Christie is the story of a former prostitute who falls in love, but runs into difficulty in turning her life around.

 Characters
 Johnny the Priest
 Two longshoremen
 A postman
 Larry — bartender
 Chris C. Christopherson — captain of the barge Simeon Winthrop
 Marthy Owen
 Anna Christopherson — Chris's daughter
 Mat Burke — a stoker
 Johnson — deckhand on barge

Act I 
The first act takes place in a bar owned by Johnny the Priest and tended by Larry. Coal-barge captain Old Chris receives a letter from his daughter, a young woman he has not seen since he lived in Sweden with his family and she was five years old. They meet at the bar and she agrees to go to the coal barge with him.

Act II 
The barge crew rescues Mat Burke and four other men who survived a shipwreck in an open boat. Anna and Mat don't get along at first, but quickly fall in love.

Act III 
A confrontation on the barge among Anna, Chris and Mat. Mat wants to marry Anna, Chris does not want her to marry a sailor, and Anna doesn't want either of them to think they can control her. She tells them the truth about her past: She was raped while living with her mother's relatives on a Minnesota farm, worked briefly as a nurse's aide, then became a prostitute. Mat reacts angrily, and he and Chris leave.

Act IV 
Mat and Chris return. Anna forgives Chris for not being part of her childhood. After a dramatic confrontation, Anna promises to abandon prostitution and Mat forgives her. Chris agrees to their marriage. Chris and Mat have both signed to work aboard a ship that is leaving for South Africa the next day. They promise to return to Anna after the voyage.

Productions 

O'Neill's first version of this play, begun in January 1919, was titled Chris Christopherson and performed as Chris in out-of-town tryouts. O'Neill revised it radically, changing the barge captain's daughter Anna from a pure woman needing to be protected into a prostitute who finds reformation and love from life on the sea. The new version, now titled Anna Christie, had its premiere on Broadway at the Vanderbilt Theatre on November 2, 1921, and ran for 177 performances before closing in April 1923. The production was staged by Arthur Hopkins and starred Pauline Lord. The desk on which O'Neill wrote the play is preserved and on display at his family's former home, Monte Cristo Cottage in Connecticut.

Alexander Woollcott in The New York Times called it "a singularly engrossing play", and advised that "all grown-up playgoers should jot down in their notebooks the name of Anna Christie as that of a play they really ought to see."

The London West End premiere was staged at the Strand Theatre (now the Novello) in 1923. This was the first time an O'Neill play was seen in the West End. The play starred Pauline Lord, who had been the original Anna Christie on Broadway. The play had a great reception. Time magazine wrote, "In London, the first night of Eugene O'Neill's Anna Christie, with Pauline Lord in the title role, received a tremendous ovation. After the first act the curtain was rung up a dozen times during the applause.

Revivals
 1952: The play was revived at the Lyceum Theatre on January 23, 1952, staged by Michael Gordon and designed by Emeline C. Roche with Celeste Holm as Anna, Kevin McCarthy, and Arthur O'Connell. It ran for 8 performances.

 1955: The play was revived at the Teatro 5 de diciembre of Mexico City, directed by Tulio Demicheli. It starred Silvia Pinal as Anna and Wolf Ruvinskis.
 1966: The play was successfully revived in Los Angeles at the Huntington Hartford Theatre on May 2 and ran through May 21.  Directed by Jack Garfein, it starred his wife Carroll Baker as Anna, with James Whitmore as Chris and Hermione Baddeley as Marthy. The show then transferred to the Tappen Zee Playhouse in Nyack, New York where it ran from June 23 to July 2 with Isabel Jewel replacing Baddeley as Marthy. 
 1977: The play was revived at the Imperial Theatre on April 14, 1977, directed by José Quintero and designed by Ben Edwards. It starred Liv Ullmann  as Anna, Robert Donley, John Lithgow and Mary McCarty. It received Tony Award nominations for Liv Ullmann as Best Actress and for Mary McCarty as Best Featured Actress. It ran for 124 performances.
 1990: The play was staged at the Young Vic theatre in London and starred Natasha Richardson.
 1993: The play was revived on Broadway on January 14, 1993 by The Roundabout Theatre Company at the Criterion Center Stage Right. It was directed by David Leveaux and designed by John Lee Beatty. It starred Natasha Richardson, Liam Neeson, Anne Meara, and Rip Torn. It received Tony Award nominations for Best Actress (Natasha Richardson), Best Actor (Liam Neeson), Best Featured Actress (Anne Meara), Best Direction (David Leveaux), and won the award for Best Revival. Neeson and Richardson both received the Theatre World Award. The production won the Drama Desk Award for Outstanding Revival and the Drama Desk Award for Outstanding Actress in a Play for Richardson. It ran for 54 performances.
 2002: The play was directed by Gar Campbell at the Pacific Resident Theatre, rerunning from January 5, 2002 to May 5, 2002, starring Lesley Fera.
 2011: The play was produced at the Donmar Warehouse, London, running from August 4, 2011 to October 8, 2011, with Ruth Wilson as Anna, Jude Law as Mat, and David Hayman as Chris. It was positively received by critics, with mostly 4 and 5 star reviews, and it won the 2012 Olivier Award for "best revival".

Adaptations

The play was adapted by Bradley King for a 1923 film of the same name directed by John Griffith Wray and Thomas H. Ince, with stars Blanche Sweet, William Russell, George F. Marion, and Eugenie Besserer.

The play inspired Kiri no Minato, directed by Kenji Mizoguchi in 1923, though the plot is quiet different from the original. This film is actually lost.

A 1930 film adaptation by Frances Marion was directed by Clarence Brown and starred Greta Garbo, Charles Bickford, George F. Marion and Marie Dressler. This pre-Code film used the marketing slogan "Garbo Talks!", as it was her first talkie. Her first spoken line has become her most famous: "Give me a whiskey with ginger ale on the side, and don't be stingy, baby." George F. Marion, who had performed the role of Anna's father in the original Broadway production, reprised the role in both the 1923 and 1930 film adaptations.

A German-language adaptation, also starring Garbo, was filmed in 1930 and released the same year, using the same production as the English language film that had concluded filming in 1929. This version was adapted by Frances Marion, translated by Walter Hasenclever and directed by Jacques Feyder. In addition to Garbo, the cast included Theo Shall, Hans Junkermann, and Salka Viertel.

In 1957, a thoroughly reworked adaptation by George Abbott with music and lyrics by Bob Merrill, called New Girl in Town, opened on Broadway. It ran for 431 performances.

In 2018, Encompass New Opera Theatre presented an opera adaptation composed by Edward Thomas with a libretto by Joe Masteroff at the Baruch College Performing Arts Center in New York City. Directed by Nancy Rhodes and conducted by Julian Wachner, it featured Melanie Long in the title role, Frank Basile as Chris, Jonathan Estabrooks as Mat, Joe Hermlayn as Marthy and Mike Pirozzi as Larry. It ran for 12 performances. A recording with the original cast, produced by Thomas Z. Shepard and conducted by Julian Wachner, with the orchestra NOVUS New York, will be released by Broadway Records on August 16, 2019. It is a collaboration of Trinity Church and Encompass New Opera Theatre.

Trivia
According to actress Ellen Burstyn in the 2012 film Marilyn in Manhattan, Marilyn Monroe performed a scene from Anna Christie at the Actors Studio with Maureen Stapleton. Calling the story "legendary," Burstyn said, "Everybody who saw that says that it was not only the best work Marilyn ever did, it was some of the best work ever seen at Studio, and certainly the best interpretation of Anna Christie anybody ever saw. She...achieved real greatness in that scene."

Awards and nominations 
Awards
 1922 Pulitzer Prize for Drama
 1993 Drama Desk Award for Best Revival of a Play
 1993 Tony Award for Best Revival of a Play
 2011 Olivier Award for Best Revival of a Play

References

Further reading

External links

 
 
 
 Production: Anna Christie — Working in the Theatre Seminar video at American Theatre Wing
 

1921 plays
Broadway plays
Drama Desk Award-winning plays
Plays by Eugene O'Neill
Pulitzer Prize for Drama-winning works
Tony Award-winning plays
West End plays
American plays adapted into films
Plays about prostitution
Plays set in New York City
Christie, Anna
Christie, Anna
Works about prostitution in the United States